Seymour Drescher (born 1934) is an American historian and a professor at the University of Pittsburgh, known for his studies on Alexis de Tocqueville and slavery and his published work Econocide.

Career 
Seymour Drescher has been publishing since 1959. He initially focused his research on Tocqueville. He was the first to attract scholarly attention to Tocqueville's views of problems of poverty, colonial slavery, and race. Of his work in this field, Tocqueville scholar Matthew Mancini, calls Seymour Drescher "arguably the finest Tocqueville scholar writing in English..."

Drescher's more recent historical studies have been primarily in the history of slavery and abolition in the Atlantic world. His book Econocide made a convincing counter-claim to Eric Williams' argument that abolition happened in part due to the economic decline of the British West Indies (BWI) after 1775. Drescher instead states that the slavery-based system which underpinned the economy of the BWI continued to be profitable prior to 1815 and that abolition actually caused the decline rather than the other way around. There has been much debate among historians regarding this topic.

Awards
 2003 – Frederick Douglass Prize

Selected works
 Econocide: British Slavery in the Era of Abolition, Pittsburgh, University of Pittsburgh Press, 1977
 Capitalism and Antislavery: British Mobilization in Comparative Perspective, New York, Oxford University Press, 1987
 From Slavery to Freedom: Comparative Studies in the Rise and the Fall of Atlantic Slavery, New York, New York University Press, 1999
 The Mighty Experiment: Free Labor versus Slavery in British Emancipation, Cambridge, Cambridge University Press, 2002
 Abolition: A History of Slavery and Antislavery, New York, Cambridge University Press, 2009  and

Life
Seymour Drescher was born in 1934 in the Bronx, New York to Polish Jewish parents. Drescher moved to Pittsburgh in 1962 with his wife, Ruth Drescher. In 2018, he narrowly avoided being a victim on the mass shooting on the Tree of Life Congregation.

References

1934 births
Living people
21st-century American historians
21st-century American male writers
American Jews
American male non-fiction writers
American people of Polish-Jewish descent
University of Pittsburgh faculty